Sparta Township, Indiana may refer to one of the following places:

 Sparta Township, Dearborn County, Indiana
 Sparta Township, Noble County, Indiana

See also

Sparta Township (disambiguation)

Indiana township disambiguation pages